Shone Tell is an entrepreneur and the founder of Yad2 the biggest online classifieds marketplace for used goods in Israel, he is the chairman of "Tell Holdings" who invest in startups from the internet industry.

According to Globs, in 2008 the American company Tiger Global Management contact Shone with an offer to buy 49% of Yad2 for valuation of 25 million dollars. Tell accepted the offer.

According to Calcalist, In 2010 after long discussions Tell sold another 26% of Yad2 to walla.co.il which is a subsidiary of Bezeq the telecommunication, he became Yad2 chairman and recruited Yaniv Gil-More  to be the company CEO. In 2013 Tell sold the rest of the company to Bezeq LTD.

In 2015, Tell invested in Viewly which optimizes nonprofit organization's donations all over the world.

In 2016, Tell became a partner in TestM, an app that allows users to self-diagnose mobile phones and tablets which allows users to sell, buy or fix their mobile phones online.

Additionally, in 2016 Tell founded Telos United SL, a real estate company that operates in Barcelona, Catalonia.
The company has acquired residential buildings in Barcelona, Terassa, Cerdanyola and Sabadell , for the purpose of improvement, rental and sale. In 2019, the company bought one of the last lots at the center of sant cugat and began construction of the residential project Anima Sant Cugat

References

External links
Yad2
Full Interview (Hebrew)
Articles list on Globs
Articles list on Calcalist

1970 births
Living people